The Metropolitan Opera Guild was established in 1935 to broaden the base of support for the Metropolitan Opera, promote greater interest in opera, and develop future audiences by reaching out to a wide public and serving as an educational resource that provides programs, publications, materials and services to schools, families, individuals, and community groups nationwide.

The Guild was the brainchild of Eleanor Robson Belmont, a retired actress and the first female member of the board of directors of the Metropolitan Opera. She believed opera truly belongs to the people, and wished to provide them with more ways to connect to and enjoy the art form. In its first 75 years, the Guild contributed more than $245 million to the Met (figure adjusted for inflation). The Guild provides programs and services in many areas designed to further these goals.

Guild Activities
The Guild pursues its mission through a variety of educational outreach programs, publishing Opera News magazine and presenting special events season.

The Guild's Education Department provides an innovative network of music and arts education programs to communities and schools nationwide. These programs include open rehearsals and performances at the Metropolitan Opera, family education programs to introduce children to opera, community lecture series, master classes, interviews with opera professionals, production panels, backstage tours of the Met Opera House, a volunteer program, school residency programs, professional development courses for teachers, and collaborations with colleges and universities throughout the country.

Opera News, the monthly magazine published by the Guild, reports on opera around the world.  Each issue includes reviews of commercial recordings and live performances, profiles of artists, and articles by eminent writers on the music scene. During the Saturday afternoon Met broadcast season, the magazine also includes an in-depth guide to both radio and HD broadcasts. With a circulation of over 100,000, it is the world's largest-circulation magazine devoted to opera.

The Guild also produces an annual series of public programs at major New York City venues that celebrate both the art and artists of opera; these include the Annual Guild Luncheon and the Opera News Awards.

Guild History

In the seasons leading up to the creation of the Met Opera Guild in 1935, the financial situation at the Met Opera was dire. The Great Depression extinguished the social structure that gave rise to the old Met Opera, a place dominated by the whims of a few rich boxholders. The real admirers of the art form were revealed in box office receipts; while “the cheap seats were often filled … (the pricey orchestra sections featured) stretches of empty seats."

Belmont's financial idea was simple: instead of supporting the opera with a million dollars from one wealthy patron, support the opera with one dollar from a million people. In her memoirs, The Fabric of Memory, Belmont recalled,
"We felt it important to broaden the base of responsibility for the future; to share in some measure privileges that had hitherto belonged to a small group of directors and stockholders. … I presented … a plan for a membership organization with specified privileges and services, in exchange for dues scaled from $10 to $100. It was agreed that a portion of each membership would go toward maintaining the opera … Democratization of opera had begun!" 
In this way, Belmont helped pioneer the multi-source private funding model used by performing arts organizations and many other cultural institutions to this day. In its first year the Guild signed up 2,000 members and contributed $5,000 to the Met Opera for the purchase of a new cyclorama.

Belmont's vision was not limited to new types of membership; other ways of connecting the people with the opera and developing an audience soon followed. Starting in 1936 the Guild began publishing Opera News magazine, initiated the backstage tours program and a lecture series. Guild student matinees began the following year. Due to financial woes of the 1970s that cut arts teachers from schools, the Guild began its teacher training and in-school artists residencies.

With European artists isolated in Europe by the political upheaval during World War II and the appreciable growth of American music conservatories during the latter half of the 19th century, American singers came into their own in the early 20th century, jump-starting the American operatic growth that continued after the war. The Met Opera Guild supported the cultivation of American opera singers (thus encouraging other opera guilds to do the same). In the 1950s, Eleanor Belmont was responsible for the National Council Auditions, which take place across the 50 states discovering new talent and funneling them to the Met Opera's stage or its Young Artist Program for further training.

Today, the Met Opera Guild follows Belmont's dedication to American singers with its Masterly Singing series; master classes that give promising young singers the chance to work with coaches, directors and teachers of the highest caliber and also share the training and rehearsal process with members of the public.

Community Programs

Since its founding, the Metropolitan Opera Guild has continuously worked to foster a stimulated and educated community connecting the drama on the stage to the last person in the Family Circle, to the remote member of the radio and HD audience.

Community Programs form the bridge across the footlights, bringing audiences nearer to opera, taking people backstage, offering insight and opportunities to explore the arts of opera. The Guild Community Programs include Lecture events, backstage tours, Opera Explorers Workshops, Score Desk seating at the opera, and overseeing the Guild's volunteer corps. Community Programs' vision is to create community, stimulate conversation, and open up opportunities that empower individuals to further explore an underlying shared interest in opera

Lectures at the Guild include lecture, master class, seminar and interview events, as well as the Met Talks -group interviews and discussions with cast and artistic crew of an opera production. The lecture events are presented by expert as well as accessible individuals ranging from professional critics and journalists, to opera conductors, directors and designers, scholars and professors, singer and vocal coaches. The lectures aim to empower audiences to explore their interest in opera.

In Opera Explorers workshops young children (aged 5–8) discover the operatic arts with their families through these innovative and interactive workshops.

By combining musical and historical background with hands-on experiential learning and physical and vocal activity, workshop participants learn to recognize characters by sight and sound, follow a complex operatic plot, and understand the power of music, acting, and design to tell a story. Its impact will be felt over years as children grow and become new opera lovers or, perhaps, are inspired to pursue their own dreams of performance.

A well-loved New York City past time for natives and tourists alike, the Backstage Tours of the Met Opera House offer a fascinating behind-the-scenes look at the Met, including the expansive scenic and carpentry shops where sets are built and painted; the costume, wardrobe, make-up, and wig departments that prep and primp today's star singers for the stage; rehearsal rooms where productions first take shape; the massive stage complex where the action comes to life; and the crown jewel auditorium.

Score-desk seats are located in the Family Circle Boxes of the Metropolitan Opera House. These special seats offer no view of the stage, but are equipped with a desk and reading light, enabling study of an opera's score during the performance.

School Partnerships

The Metropolitan Opera and the Metropolitan Opera Guild are committed to finding and fostering the next generation of opera lovers through vital programs in schools and communities across the country and advancing the role of opera in education. The Guild's education initiatives reach more than 1,600 schools in 20 states. School Partnerships include the Access Opera program, Urban Voices choruses, vocal mentorships and professional development for teachers.

The Guild believes opera is essential to well-rounded learning and teaching. The powerful and positive impact of arts education is well established. Inherently multidisciplinary, opera presents a powerful strategy for integrated instruction. The Guild created Opera-Based Learning as an instructional approach using the components of opera (music composition, libretto writing, acting, singing, literary analysis, staging, and critical response) as an integral part of teaching and learning. Opera-Based Learning includes opportunities for students to create, present, and attend opera. Ideally arts education includes all three of these strands, thereby optimizing students’ learning with arts fully integrated into their scholastic lives.

Guild Membership
The Guild provides economically accessible forms of membership to opera lovers and classical music enthusiasts. Guild membership encompasses seven tiers of giving levels, with benefits including Opera News subscription, priority purchase period, discounts and access to the Belmont Room in the Metropolitan Opera House. Guild membership fees go to support the activities of The Metropolitan Opera, and ranges between $5–6 million in recent years.

References

External links
 Met Opera Guild website

Metropolitan Opera Guild